Saue Parish (Estonian: Saue vald) is a rural municipality in Harju County, north-western Estonia.

The administrative centre of Saue Parish is Saue. It is situated in the suburban area of Estonia's capital, Tallinn.

After the administrative reform of Estonia in 2017, the historical Saue Parish was merged into new Saue Parish (together with Saue, Kernu and Nissi), retaining its name.

History 
Established in 1918, new-established in 2017.

Local government 
Current chairman of the council (Estonian: volikogu esimees) is Harry Pajundi.

Current mayor (Estonian: vallavanem) is Andres Laisk.

Religion

Geography

Populated places 
There are 3 small borough (est: alevik) and several villages (est: külad, sg. küla) in Saue Parish.

Small boroughs: Laagri - Riisipere - Turba

Villages: Ääsmäe - Aila - Allika - Alliku - Aude - Ellamaa - Haiba - Hüüru - Hingu - Jaanika - Jõgisoo - Kaasiku - Kabila - Kernu - Kibuna - Kiia - Kirikla - Kivitammi - Kohatu - Koidu - Koppelmaa - Kustja - Laitse - Lehetu - Lepaste - Madila - Maidla - Metsanurga - Mõnuste - Munalaskme - Mustu - Muusika - Nurme - Odulemma - Pällu - Pärinurme - Pohla - Püha - Ruila - Siimika - Tabara - Tagametsa - Tuula - Ürjaste - Valingu - Vanamõisa - Vansi - Vatsla - Vilumäe - Viruküla

References

External links 
 

 
Municipalities of Estonia